The Mobile Protected Firepower (MPF) system is a U.S. Army program to procure a combat vehicle that is capable of providing mobile protected direct offensive fire capability. This vehicle is considered a light tank by some sources, but not according to Army officals. The program is part of the Next Generation Combat Vehicle program. A previous light tank development for the Army, the M8 Armored Gun System, was canceled in 1996. 

The Army downselected General Dynamics Land Systems' (GDLS) Griffin II and BAE Systems' M8 AGS to go forward with evaluation. Both companies delivered prototypes of their vehicles in 2020. BAE's submission was disqualified in 2022. The Army selected the GDLS model later that year. The Army has a requirement for 504 units.

History

Background

The Army recognized the poor performance of the M551 Sheridan light tank in Vietnam and began the process of retiring the vehicle in 1977. A small number were retained in active service by the 82nd Airborne Division and the National Guard. 

The Army began a series of projects in the 1980s to either improve the Sheridan or replace it altogether. Some of its efforts around this time could be described as hopelessly intermingled. After a series of false starts, in June 1992 the Army selected FMC's Armored Gun System (AGS) to go into low-rate initial production.  The AGS was expected to replace the Sheridan in the 3/73rd Armor of the 82nd Airborne Division and TOW missile-armed Humvees in the 2nd Armored Cavalry Regiment. The Army canceled the AGS in 1996, citing an unfavorable outyear funding environment.

The 3/73rd Armor was inactivated over the following two years. The last Sheridans in service were vismod Sheridans used for opposing force training. These too were retired in 2004.

In 1999, Army Chief of Staff Eric Shinseki laid out his vision for a lighter, more transportable force. The Army began the Interim Armored Vehicle (IAV) program to implement Shinseki's concept. United Defense LP entered a variant of the AGS to meet the Mobile Gun System requirement; however the Army selected the General Dynamics Land Systems 8×8 LAV III derivative.

Design requirements

The Army stated in its request for proposals in 2015 that it expected the MPF to operate in concert with the Army Ground Mobility Vehicle and Light Reconnaissance Vehicle. The Army said the MPF will operate in "austere and unpredictable locations."

The Army opted not to add a requirement for an air-drop capability, unlike the M8 Armored Gun System, which had this capability. According to an Army Futures Command official, as of 2021, one of the two competing team's bids was potentially light enough to airdrop due to its "significantly" lighter weight.

Competition

In November 2017, the Army issued a request for proposal (RFP) for the Engineering and Manufacturing Development (EMD) phase and, in order to maximize competition, planned to award up to two Middle Tier Acquisition (MTA) contracts for the EMD phase in early 2019. The expected buy was 504 MPF systems.

Science Applications International Corporation partnered with ST Kinetics and CMI Defence. The design paired CMI's Cockerill 305 turret to an ST Kinetics Next Generation Armored Fighting Vehicle hull. BAE Systems offered a vehicle based on the M8 Armored Gun System. General Dynamics Land Systems offered a variant of the Griffin II.

The GDLS light tank incorporates components and systems from the British Ajax IFV (itself based on the Austrian–Spanish ASCOD). It was publicly unveiled on 22 April 2020. BAE Systems' proposal was a lighter updated version of the M8 Armored Gun System, which was canceled in 1996.

In December 2018, the Army downselected BAE and GDLS's proposals to move forward. The Army awarded Rapid Prototyping contracts for MPF not to exceed $376 million to these two companies. 

GDLS delivered its prototypes (based on the Griffin II) in December 2020. BAE faced production difficulties and supplier issues related to the COVID-19 pandemic, which delayed delivery until March 2021. The assessment phase began in January 2021 at Fort Bragg, North Carolina, with testing scheduled to run through June 2021. In March 2022, BAE was reportedly disqualified from the competition due to "noncompliance issues", leaving GDLS as the only remaining option.

The Army selected the GDLS Griffin II light tank in June 2022. The initial contract is for 96 low-rate initial production (LRIP) vehicles, with first delivery by the end of 2023.

Production and fielding 

As of January 2023, delivery of the first LRIP MPF system is expected in 19 months, and initial operational testing and evaluation is planned for the end of FY2024. The first unit equipped is scheduled for the fourth quarter of FY2025, consisting of a battalion of 42 MPFs. Each LRIP MPF system is expected to cost about $12.8 million. Full-rate production MPF systems are expected to cost less than LRIP units.

The Army’s MPF acquisition objective is for 504 systems, with Army officials noting that this number could vary slightly. Each IBCT will be allocated 14 MPFs. The MPFs will form a divisional level battalion, from which companies will the be detailed to the IBCTs. The targeted fielding for the first unit equipped is FY2025. Under current Army plans, four MPF battalions are to be fielded by 2030, with the bulk of the planned acquisition scheduled to be completed by 2035.

Design features 

As of 2023, there is a limited quantity of serviceable 105 mm ammunition for MPF training and operational use. As such, there could be a requirement to procure additional 105 mm ammunition.

In 2023, MPF product manager LTC Peter George said that although the Ajax was the starting point for the GDLS MPF, the current chassis shares little in common with the Ajax and "it's difficult to see the similarities."

See also 

 M1128 Mobile Gun System, an assault gun Stryker variant
 M1134 Anti-Tank Guided Missile Vehicle, a Stryker tank destroyer variant
 MGM-166 LOSAT, a canceled U.S. Army line-of-sight guided missile
 XM1202 Mounted Combat System, a U.S. Army Future Combat Systems 20-ton tank canceled in 2011
 XM1219 Armed Robotic Vehicle, a U.S. Army Future Combat Systems unmanned ground combat vehicle canceled in 2011

Notes

References

Bibliography

External links 

An interview and walk-around of an MPF prototype with the product manager

Light tanks of the United States
Airborne tanks
Fire support vehicles
Post–Cold War light tanks
Post–Cold War tanks of the United States
Trial and research tanks of the United States